Altangadasyn Sodnomdarjaa (born 16 January 1968) is a Mongolian speed skater. He competed in two events at the 1992 Winter Olympics.

References

External links
 

1968 births
Living people
Mongolian male speed skaters
Olympic speed skaters of Mongolia
Speed skaters at the 1992 Winter Olympics
Sportspeople from Ulaanbaatar
Speed skaters at the 1990 Asian Winter Games
20th-century Mongolian people